Stephen Welsh (born 19 January 2000) is a Scottish professional footballer who plays as a centre-back for Scottish Premiership club Celtic.

Club career
Welsh began his career in the youth sides at Celtic, stepping up to their development side in 2017, and in March 2018, signed a contract with the club until 2020. Alongside fixtures in the SPFL Development League, he featured for the team in the Scottish Challenge Cup.

On 29 August 2019, Welsh moved on a season-long loan to Scottish Championship club Greenock Morton. He was recalled by Celtic during January 2020. He made his first team debut for Celtic on 2 February 2020, in a 4–1 win away to Hamilton Academical.

On 6 February 2021, Welsh scored the first senior goal of his career with a header from a David Turnbull corner in the opening minutes of a 2–1 league win against Motherwell. On 13 April 2021, he signed a new contract with Celtic that is due to run until 2025. On 9 December 2021, Welsh scored an early header against La Liga side Real Betis in a UEFA Europa League match where Celtic won 3–2 at Celtic Park in their last group-stage game in the competition that season.

On 31 July 2022, Welsh scored the first goal in Celtic's 2022–23 Scottish Premiership opener against Aberdeen in a 2–0 home win. On 10 January 2022, it was reported that Serie A side Udinese had made a loan offer with an option to purchase attached for Welsh, which Celtic chose to reject.

In the summer transfer window, Ligue 1 side Toulouse made an approach for Welsh. However, Celtic remained uninterested in selling the player as manager Ange Postecoglou seen him as being part of first-team plans.

International career
Welsh has represented Scotland at under-17, under-19 and under-21 levels. He captained the under-21 side on numerous occasions. On 10 June 2022, he played his final game for the under-21s against Denmark in a 1–1 UEFA European Under-21 Championship qualifying draw where he faced Celtic teammate Matt O'Riley.

Career statistics

Honours
Celtic
Scottish Premiership: 2021–22
Scottish League Cup: 2021–22

References

2000 births
Living people
Footballers from Coatbridge
Scottish footballers
Association football defenders
Scotland youth international footballers
Celtic F.C. players
Greenock Morton F.C. players
Scottish Professional Football League players
Scotland under-21 international footballers